Vancouver-Fairview is a provincial electoral district for the Legislative Assembly of British Columbia, Canada. Fairview is made up of two rectangles: one bounded by Granville Street to the east, 16th Avenue to the south, Arbutus Street to the West and 4th Avenue to the north; and a second area bounded on the east by Main Street, on the west by Granville Street, to the south by 33rd Avenue and to the north by the West 4th-West 6th-West 2nd Avenue road.

Electoral history
This riding has elected the following Members of Legislative Assembly:

Election results 

|-

|NDP
|Jenn McGinn
|align="right"|5,752
|align="right"|46.98
|align="right"|
|align="right"|$70,030

|-

|}

Student vote results 
Student Vote Canada is a non-partisan program in Canada that holds mock elections in elementary and high schools alongside general elections (with the same candidates and same electoral system).

References

External links 
Map of riding
BC Stats
Results of 2001 election (pdf)
2001 Expenditures (pdf)
Results of 1996 election
1996 Expenditures
Results of 1991 election
1991 Expenditures
Website of the Legislative Assembly of British Columbia

Politics of Vancouver
British Columbia provincial electoral districts
Provincial electoral districts in Greater Vancouver and the Fraser Valley